Timothy Ian Maloney, OAM (born 6 October 1967)  is an Australian wheelchair basketball player.  He was born in Adelaide, South Australia. He was part of the Australia men's national wheelchair basketball team at the 1992 Barcelona and 1996 Atlanta Paralympics; in 1996 he won a gold medal as part of the winning team, for which he received a Medal of the Order of Australia. In 2000, he received an Australian Sports Medal.

References

 Aiming high

Paralympic wheelchair basketball players of Australia
Paralympic gold medalists for Australia
Wheelchair basketball players at the 1992 Summer Paralympics
Wheelchair category Paralympic competitors
Wheelchair basketball players at the 1996 Summer Paralympics
Recipients of the Medal of the Order of Australia
Recipients of the Australian Sports Medal
Living people
Medalists at the 1996 Summer Paralympics
1967 births
Paralympic medalists in wheelchair basketball